Cheiracanthium abbreviatum is a spider species found in France and Denmark.

See also 
 List of Eutichuridae species

References 

abbreviatum
Spiders of Europe
Spiders described in 1878